Cyrtoclytus is a genus of beetles belonging to the family Cerambycidae.

The species of this genus are found in Eurasia and Northern America.

Species:
 Cyrtoclytus agathus Holzschuh, 1999

References

Cerambycidae
Cerambycidae genera